The 1974 international cricket season extended from May to August 1974.

Season overview

June

India in England

Ireland in Holland

July

Pakistan in England

References

1974 in cricket